The following is a list of events affecting American television during 2006. Events listed include television show debuts, finales, cancellations, and new channel initiations.

Notable events

January

February

March

April

May

June

July

August

September

October

November

December

Programs

Shows debuting in 2006

Shows returning in 2006

Shows changing networks
The following shows will air new episodes on a different network than previous first-run episodes.

Shows ending in 2006

Entering syndication in 2006

Made-for-TV movies

Television stations

Station launches

Network affiliation changes

Births

Deaths

See also 
 2006 in the United States
 List of American films of 2006

References

External links 
List of 2006 American television series at IMDb

 
2000s in American television